The mixed pair competition at the 2001 World Games in Akita was played from 19 to 21 August. 12 acrobatic gymnastics competitors, from 6 nations, participated in the tournament. The acrobatic gymnastics competition took place at Akita City Gymnasium in Akita, Japan.

Competition format
The top 4 teams in qualifications, based on combined scores of each round, advanced to the final. The scores in qualification do not count in the final.

Results

Qualification

Final

References

External links
 Results on IWGA website

Mixed pair